Streblitinae is a subfamily of Upper Jurassic and Lower Cretaceous ammonites within the family Oppeliidae characterized by compressed, involute shells; typically oxycones with complex sutures. Includes Streblites,  Pseudoppelia, and  Substreblites. Derivation is from the Taramelliceratinae.  May have given rise to the Aconiceratinade.

References
W.J. Arkell et al., 1957  Mesozoic Ammonoidea. Treatise on Invertebrate Paleontology, Part L. Geological Society of America and University of Kansas Press.

D.T. Donovan, J.H. Callomon, and M.K. Howarth, 1981. Classification of the Jurassic Ammonitina.  The Systematics Association Special Volume no. 18. The Ammonoidea. Academic Press.

Oppeliidae
Late Jurassic first appearances
Early Cretaceous extinctions